Andre Johan Seymore (born 16 February 1975) is a retired South African cricketer. A right-handed upper-order batsman and occasional leg break bowler, he played first-class cricket for several provincial teams including Northern Transvaal, Gauteng, Easterns and Titans. In total, he was selected for almost 200 first-class and List A matches.

Seymore also played club cricket in England; he was the club professional for Frenchay Cricket Club in the West of England Premier League from 1999 until 2001, scoring 1685 runs across the three season, in addition Seymore played for Accrington in the Lancashire League during the 2002 and 2003 seasons. He played 59 matches for Accrington, scoring 2,529 runs at an average of 54.97.

References

1975 births
Living people
People from Rustenburg
South African cricketers
Gauteng cricketers
Easterns cricketers
Titans cricketers
Northerns cricketers